Ronni Ancona & Co is a comedy sketch show that aired on BBC One in 2007. The sketches all consisted of impressions of well-known celebrities amongst other comedy sketches of fictional characters created by Ronni Ancona. Phil Cornwell, Jan Ravens and John Sessions all starred in the series with Ancona. Bill Oddie also made a cameo appearance in the first episode.
Fellow impressionist Alistair McGowan appeared in the first episode in a spoof of a perfume advertisement.

Impressions
Celebrities that are spoofed on the show included:
Kate Moss
Pete Doherty
Nicole Kidman
Amy Winehouse
Demi Moore
Jade Goody
Nigella Lawson
Coleen Rooney
Andie MacDowell
Courteney Cox
Cher
Julie Andrews
Tom Cruise
Katie Holmes
Meryl Streep
George Michael
Jordan
Jennifer Saunders
Kerry Katona
Penélope Cruz

External links
 

2007 British television series debuts
2007 British television series endings
2000s British television sketch shows
BBC television sketch shows
English-language television shows